The Apple A9 is a 64-bit ARM-based system-on-chip (SoC), designed by Apple Inc. Manufactured for Apple by both TSMC and Samsung, it first appeared in the iPhone 6S and 6S Plus which were introduced on September 9, 2015. Apple states that it has 70% more CPU performance and 90% more graphics performance compared to its predecessor, the Apple A8. On September 12, 2018, the iPhone 6S and iPhone 6S Plus along with the first-generation iPhone SE was discontinued, ending production of A9 chips.  The latest software updates for the iPhone 6S & 6S Plus including the iPhone SE 1st generation variants systems using this chip are iOS 15.7.3, released on January 23, 2023 as they were discontinued with the release of iOS 16 in 2022, while updates for the iPad (5th generation) variants systems using this chip are still supported.

Design 

The A9 features an Apple-designed 64-bit 1.85 GHz ARMv8-A dual-core CPU called Twister. The A9 in the iPhone 6S has 2 GB of LPDDR4 RAM included in the package. The A9 has a per-core L1 cache of 64 KB for data and 64 KB for instructions, an L2 cache of 3 MB shared by both CPU cores, and a 4 MB L3 cache that services the entire SoC and acts as a victim cache. The A9 also features a custom PowerVR Series7XT @ 650 MHz GPU, featuring 6x custom shader cores and compiler from Apple.
 
The A9 includes a new image processor, a feature originally introduced in the A5 and last updated in the A7, with better temporal and spatial noise reduction as well as improved local tone mapping.  The A9 directly integrates an embedded M9 motion coprocessor, a feature originally introduced with the A7 as a separate chip.  In addition to servicing the accelerometer, gyroscope, compass, and barometer, the M9 coprocessor can recognize Siri voice commands. 

The A9 has video codec encoding support for H.264. It has decoding support for HEVC, H.264, MPEG‑4, and Motion JPEG.

The A9 features a custom storage solution, which uses an Apple-designed NVMe-based controller that communicates over a PCIe connection. The iPhone 6s' NAND design is more akin to a PC-class SSD than embedded flash memory common on mobile devices. This gives the phone a significant storage performance advantage over competitors which often use eMMC or UFS to connect to their flash memory.

Microarchitecture
The A9's microarchitecture is similar to the second generation Cyclone (used in A8 chip) microarchitecture. Some of the microarchitectural features are as follows:

About half of the performance boost over A8 comes from the 1.85 GHz frequency. About a quarter comes from the better memory subsystem (3× bigger caches). The remaining quarter comes from the microarchitectural tuning and smaller technology node.

Encryption
According to Apple, "Every iOS device has a dedicated AES-256 crypto engine built into the DMA path between the flash storage and main system memory, making file encryption highly efficient. On A9 or later A-series processors, the flash storage subsystem is on an isolated bus that is only granted access to memory containing user data via the DMA crypto engine."

Dual sourcing(Chipgate)
Apple A9 chips are fabricated by two companies: Samsung and TSMC. The Samsung version is called APL0898, which is manufactured on a 14 nm FinFET process and is 96 mm2 large, while the TSMC version is called APL1022, which is manufactured on a 16 nm FinFET process and is 104.5 mm2 large. 

There was intended to be no significant difference in performance between the parts, but in October 2015, it was alleged that iPhone 6S models with Samsung-fabricated A9 chips consistently measured shorter battery life than those with TSMC-fabricated versions in CPU heavy usage; web browsing and graphics were not very different. Apple responded that "tests which run the processors with a continuous heavy workload until the battery depletes are not representative of real-world usage", and said that internal testing combined with customer data demonstrated a variance of only 2–3%.

Naming
While the Twister CPU core implements the ARMv8-A instruction set architecture licensed from ARM Holdings, it is an independent CPU design and is unrelated to the much older but similarly named Cortex-A9 and ARM9 CPU that are designed by ARM themselves and implement the 32-bit ARMv7-A and ARMv5E versions of the architecture.

Gallery
The processors are nearly identical visually. The packaging have the same dimensions (approx 15.0×14.5 mm) and only superficial differences, like the designation text. Inside the packaging the silicon die differs in size.

ARKit
The A9 processor is listed as the minimum requirement for ARKit.

Products that include the Apple A9 
 iPhone 6S & 6S Plus
 iPhone SE (1st generation)
 iPad (5th generation)

See also 
 Apple silicon, the range of ARM-based processors designed by Apple.
 Apple A9X

References

Computer-related introductions in 2015
Products and services discontinued in 2022
Apple silicon